Christianity is a small minority in Uttar Pradesh, the largest state of India. Uttar Pradesh is within the territory of Lucknow and Agra Diocese of Church of North India (a member of the Anglican Communion) and of the Archdiocese of Agra (Roman Catholic Church) and Uttar Pradesh Christian Revival Church (UPCRC) has started on 09.07.2017 Christian Revival Church.

History

Mughal India
Christianity was first introduced to Uttar Pradesh during the reign of Mughal Emperor Akbar (1556-1605). Akbar was known for his secular theology. He sought out educated Jesuit Priests from Goa and gave them permission to bring Christianity to his people. However, Christianity in this state has long been a tiny, stagnant minority. In recent years many people are baptized, mainly in Protestantism. India is also called as place for all religion.

British Raj
During British Raj many people converted to Christianity, most of them employed in Indian Army or Government offices. During the 1857 revolt, many Indian Christians were killed in the uprising, while revolters took revenge from the United Kingdom; as for them an Indian Christian was synonymous to being British.

Churches in Uttar Pradesh
 All Saints Cathedral, Allahabad (Church of North India)
 Christ Church, Lucknow
 Church of Epiphany, Lucknow (CNI)
 Kanpur Memorial Church
 St. Jude's Shrine, Jhansi (Roman Catholic)

 All saints garrison church (CNI), Lucknow 
 Cathedral of the Immaculate Conception, Agra (Roman Catholic)
 Central Methodist Church, Lucknow 
 Church Church, Kanpur
 Church Of The Ascension, Aligarh
 CNI Church, Faizabad 
 CNI City Church, Jhansi
 CNI Gwaltoli Church, Kanpur
 Holy Trinity Church, Allahabad
 Jamuna Church, Allahabad 
 LLJM Methodist Church, Kanpur
 Methodist Church, Bareilly 
 Nani Community Church, Allahabad 
 Sacred Heart Church, Jhansi 
 Sacred Heart Church, Tajpur, Bijnor
 St. Andrew's CNI Church, Gorakhpur 
 St. George's Church, Banda
 St. George's CNI Cathedral, Agra
 St. John's Church, Agra 
 St. John's church, Meerut 
 St. John's CNI Church, Gorakhpur 
 St. Joseph's Cathedral, Lucknow
 St. Joseph's Roman Catholic Church, Uttar Pradesh
 St. Martin's English Church, Jhansi
 St. Mary's Cathedral Church (Varanasi)
 St. Mary's Church, Uttar Pradesh
 St. Peter's CNI Church, Allahabad 
 St. Peter's CNI Church, Lucknow 
 St. Stephen's CNI Church, Bareilly 
 St.Paul Church CNI, Varanasi
 Telliyabagh Bagh CNI Church, Varanasi 
 Uttar Pradesh Christian Revival Church (UPCRC)

List of denominations and their Institutions 
Methodist Church Of India
Church of North India
Roman Catholic Church
Ministry Of Jesus Of India
Assembly of God Church
Bible Presbyterian Church of India (1) (2)
Fellowship of Free Baptist Churches in North India (1) (2)
Reformed Episcopal Church (1) (2)
The Pentecostal Mission
Bethel Pentecostal Church
Church of God (FG) in India 
Allahabad Bible Seminary, Allahabad 
All saint's College, Nainital 
Sherwood College, Nainital 
La Martiniere boys college, Lucknow
La Martiniere girls college, Lucknow
Bishop Johnson College, Allahabad 
IPEM international College, Allahabad 
Bishop Westcott School, Kanpur 
St. John's College, Agra 
Christ Church Degree College, Kanpur 
Ewing Christian College, Allahabad 
St. Andrew's Degree College, Gorakhpur
Christian Revival Church

Sources: (1) World Christian Encyclopedia; 2nd ed., 2001 Volume 1, p. 368-370; (2) The Encyclopedia of Christianity, Volume 4

References

See also

 List of Christian denominations in North East India
 Christian Revival Church

 

 
Religion in Uttar Pradesh